East Danforth, also known as Danforth Village, is a neighbourhood in the east end of Toronto, Ontario, Canada. It is located on the eastern part of Danforth Avenue in the old city of Toronto. It stretches from the eastern edge of Greektown by Greenwood Avenue to the boundary of Scarborough at Victoria Park Avenue. The area is covered by two business improvement associations, Danforth Village and Danforth Mosaic. To the north of the neighbourhood is Old East York, once a separate municipality, but today closely integrated into the area. The southern border is the railway tracks, beyond which is Leslieville and the Upper Beaches. According to the 2006 census the area has a population of 14,629.

History

The area first appeared in the 19th century as the 'Coleman' postal village centered on the intersection of Danforth and Dawes (a street built through the lands of the local Taylor family) with a general store and inn. With the building of the railways in the mid-19th century the area acquired a train station, East Toronto.

By the turn of the century the area was called "Little York" (an original name of Toronto) and became a part of the short-lived Town of East Toronto. The turn of the 20th century also brought the construction of the Prince Edward Viaduct connecting Bloor and Danforth, which encouraged the development of the Luttrell Loop on Danforth, and a streetcar terminus for the Bloor-Danforth, Gerrard and former Coxwell streetcar routes which connected to the old train station.

The area developed from the 1910s thru the 1930s as a streetcar suburb along the Danforth streetcar line. Most of the housing to the north and south of the street dates from this period. In 1966 the Bloor-Danforth subway line replaced the streetcar. The neighbourhood is served by six subway stations: Donlands, Greenwood, Coxwell, Woodbine, Main Street, and Victoria Park.

In the 1960s and 1970s a number of apartment towers were built in the area, most notably the Crescent Town area just north of Danforth at Victoria Park and the Main Square complex south of Danforth at Main Street. Most of the area remains low-rise, with low-end stores along Danforth and single-family homes to the north and south. At the far east of the neighborhood is the Shoppers World Danforth, a strip/shopping mall built in 1962 (revamped in the 1990s) and housed in a former munitions factory.

The neighborhood is home to a large Muslim community. Under construction is the Madina Masjid, which will be one of the largest mosques in Toronto.

Education
 Earl Haig Public School is an Elementary-Middle School, which enrolls students from kindergarten to grade 8.
 George Webster Public School is an Elementary-Middle School, which enrolls students from kindergarten to grade 8.
 Secord Elementary School is an Elementary School, which enrolls students from kindergarten to grade 6.
 Earl Beatty Public School is an Elementary-Middle School, which enrolls students from kindergarten to grade 8.
 Gledhill Public School is an elementary school which enrolls students from Junior Kindergarten to Grade 6.
 St. Brigid Catholic School is an elementary school offering classes from Junior Kindergarten to Grade 8.

References

Further reading
Radwanski, Adam. "A taste of the other Danforth." The Globe and Mail. August 9, 2008
Barmak, Sarah. "The Other Danforth; It's urban and handy to the subway, but for intensification this 'avenue' has to settle for a Tim's and an Esso." Toronto Star. Aug 18, 2007. pg. CO.1
Ireland, Carolyn. "Hot Neighbourhoods: Danforth Mosaic."  The Globe and Mail. September 30, 2010

External links
 Danforth Mosaic BIA
 Danforth Village BIA

Neighbourhoods in Toronto